Jeff Driskill is a former American football coach. He served as the second head football coach at Lindenwood University in St. Charles, Missouri and he held that position for three seasons, from 1992 until 1994.  His record at Lindenwood was 6–24–1.

Head coaching record

References

Year of birth missing (living people)
Living people
Lindenwood Lions football coaches